IROC XIV was the fourteenth year of the International Race of Champions auto racing competition. It took place in 1990 and was the first year the Dodge Daytona was used in competition, and continued the format introduced in IROC VIII. Due to not getting enough test time for the new cars, the originally scheduled opener at Daytona International Speedway was canceled. Race one took place on the Talladega Superspeedway, race two took place at Burke Lakefront Airport, and race three ran at Michigan International Speedway. Dale Earnhardt won the series championship, his first of four, and won $175,000.

Roster and total points
The roster of drivers and final points standings were as follows:

Individual race results

Race One, Talladega Superspeedway
Saturday, May 5th, 1990

(5) Indicates 5 bonus points added to normal race points scored for leading the most laps.(3) Indicates 3 bonus points added to normal race points scored for leading the 2nd most laps(2) Indicates 2 bonus points added to normal race points scored for leading the 3rd most laps.

Average speed: 188.055 mphCautions: noneMargin of victory: 1 clLead changes: 15

Race Two, Burke Lakefront Airport
Saturday, July 7th, 1990

(5) Indicates 5 bonus points added to normal race points scored for leading the most laps.(3) Indicates 3 bonus points added to normal race points scored for leading the 2nd most laps(2) Normally indicates 2 bonus points added to normal race points scored for leading the 3rd most laps but since that did not occur in this race it was not awarded.

Average speed: 101.469 mphCautions: noneMargin of victory: 4 secLead changes: 2

Race Three, Michigan International Speedway
Saturday, August 5th, 1990

(5) Indicates 5 bonus points added to normal race points scored for leading the most laps.(3) Normally indicates 3 bonus points added to normal race points scored for leading the 2nd most laps but since it did not occur in this race it was not awarded.(2) Normally indicates 2 bonus points added to normal race points scored for leading the 3rd most laps but since it did not occur in this race it was not awarded.

Average speed: 153.316 mphCautions: 1Margin of victory: .08 secLead changes: 0

Notes
 Dorsey Schroeder and Rusty Wallace tied for seventh place in the championship standings, but Schroeder was awarded the position due to a higher finishing position in the final race.
 Bobby Rahal and Geoff Brabham tied for tenth place in the championship standings, but Rahal was awarded the position due to a higher finishing position in the final race.
 Darrell Waltrip did not start the final two races due to injury.

References

External links
IROC XIV History - IROC Website

International Race of Champions
1990 in American motorsport